The Maidstone-class frigate was a 32-gun 5th-rate frigate class of two ships designed by Sir John Henslow and based on his Alcmene class, ordered on 4 February 1795. The class was a close copy of the Alcmene class, but were instead constructed of pitch pine. This lighter material caused the class to be armed with 12-pound guns instead of the 18-pound guns that had been expected. Neither ship of the class had a long career, with HMS Shannon sold at Sheerness Dockyard in May 1802 and [[HMS Maidstone (1795)|HMS Maidstone]] put in ordinary at Chatham Dockyard in 1804 and broken up in 1810.

Design and construction
The Maidstone class frigates were built to the same design as the Alcmene class of Sir John Henslow. While the Alcmene class was built of oak, the Maidstone class used pitch pine instead; fears about the ability of ships constructed with pitch pine to hold heavy guns led to the armament of the class being changed from the 18-pounders they had been expected to carry to smaller 12-pound guns. Pitch pine-built ships were lighter than their oak contemporaries and thus required more ballast and rolled more at sea, making the handling of heavy guns like 18-pounders less feasible. By this time the Admiralty considered such 12-pounder frigates obsolete, and this class along with the unique frigate HMS Triton were the last frigates built with 12-pounders until the Napoleonic Wars. As well as the calibre of the guns, the Maidstone class was different to the Alcmene class in several small ways, including having enhanced barricades on the quarterdeck and a square (rather than rounded) stern.Gardiner, First Frigates, p. 52

The class was only moderately fast, ranging from nine to twelve knots depending on the weather, but was especially well-handled in strong winds. The sides of the ships were relatively high for 12-pounder frigates, being originally built for 18-pounders, and this provided the ships with 'unprecedented freeboard' among their contemporaries.

Construction of the class was authorised on 4 February 1795 and the contract for both ships was awarded to Deptford Dockyard, where they would be built by the shipwright Martin Ware until June 1795 and subsequently by Thomas Pollard. They measured 796 tons burthen. The finalised armament of the class was twenty-six 12-pounders on the gundeck, four 6-pounders and four 24-pound carronades on the quarterdeck, and two 6-pounders and two 24-pound carronades on the forecastle. In around 1808 Maidstone had all her 6-pounders replaced by an equal number of 24-pound carronades.Gardiner, First Frigates, p. 83

Ships

Maidstone
HMS Maidstone was commissioned under Captain John Mathews in January 1796 for the Leeward Islands Station, where she took the 12-gun privateer Le Flibuster on 24 June 1797. Upon the death of Mathews, Captain Ross Donnelly assumed command, serving at Jamaica, Halifax, and finally in the English Channel in 1801. Under Captain Richard Hussey Moubray Maidstone then sailed for the Mediterranean Sea in 1802, taking the 8-gun ship L'Arabe there on 14 June 1803. Under Captain George Elliott Maidstone then served at the blockade of Toulon, taking part in the destruction of a number of ships off Le Lavandou on 11 July 1804. She was laid up in ordinary at Chatham in December of the same year, and was broken up there in 1810.

Shannon
HMS Shannon was commissioned under Captain Alexander Fraser in February 1796 for the Irish Station. While on station she took the 16-gun privateer La Mouche on 5 December 1797, the 24-gun privateer Le Duguay Trouin on 2 February 1798, the 18-gun privateer La Julie on 23 June 1798, and the 20-gun privateer Le Grand Milieu on 15 January 1799. In April 1799 command of Shannon changed to Captain Charles Pater, under whom she participated in the Vlieter incident in August. Captain Jonas Rose assumed command in 1801, and Shannon was sold at Sheerness in May 1802.

Notes and citations
Notes

Citations

References

 Gardiner, Robert (1992) The First Frigates: Nine-pounder & Twelve-pounder Frigates 1748-1815 London: Conway Maritime Press. .
 Gardiner, Robert (1994) The Heavy Frigate: Eighteen-Pounder Frigates: Vol I, 1778-1800'' London: Conway Maritime Press. .
 

Fifth-rate frigates of the Royal Navy
Ship classes of the Royal Navy
Ships built in Deptford